Henry Danger is an American comedy television series created by Dan Schneider and Dana Olsen that aired on Nickelodeon from July 26, 2014 to March 21, 2020. The series stars Jace Norman, Cooper Barnes, Riele Downs, Sean Ryan Fox, Ella Anderson, and Michael D. Cohen.

Premise 
Henry Hart is a 13-year-old boy who lives in the town of Swellview. He lands a part-time job as Kid Danger, a sidekick of Swellview's well-known superhero Captain Man. Captain Man tells Henry not to tell anybody about his job, so he attempts to keep it a secret from his best friends, Charlotte and Jasper, his younger sister, Piper, and his parents. Henry goes to a shop called "Junk 'n' Stuff" which has a secret lair called the Man Cave hidden underneath where Captain Man does his work. Captain Man says he will not be around for long and needs help; soon enough, he will need someone to take his place when he is gone.

Episodes

Cast and characters  

 Jace Norman as Henry Hart / Kid Danger is a 13-year-old boy who becomes the sidekick of Captain Man. He is an average kid with friends and an after school job as Captain Man's superhero sidekick. Thanks to his skills and gadgets, Kid Danger has no problem helping Captain Man on his missions. He will always be with his friends even if he has to go save the world. In "Hour of Power", Henry gains super-quick reflexes during the fight against Captain Man's former sidekick Drex.
 Cooper Barnes as Ray Manchester / Captain Man is a superhero who trains Henry. About 25 years ago, Ray Manchester's scientist father Dr. Carl Manchester accidentally pulled a lever on his Trans-Molecular Densitizer that Ray crashed into when riding his skateboard causing him to be indestructible and yet can still feel some pain for a short time. Now he is a crime-fighting superhero. He needed a sidekick, so he chooses Henry. Captain Man's Man-Cave is located underneath "Junk 'n' Stuff". Ray is shown to have a crush on Mrs. Hart despite the fact that she is married, which sometimes irritates Henry and he tries to force Ray to go do something else for the time being.
 Riele Downs as Charlotte is one of Henry's best friends. She is sarcastic, clever, and smart. She is the "sass master" of the bunch, always there to snap everyone back to reality. She and Henry have been best friends for a long time and therefore she is close enough to him to tell it like it is. She is a big fan of Captain Man. In the fourth episode, Charlotte figures out Henry's secret and gets a job as Henry and Ray's manager.
 Sean Ryan Fox as Jasper Dunlop is one of Henry's best friends. He is full of ideas, but most of them are not good. He has been Henry's best friend since preschool. He is a bucket collector who always embarrasses Henry and Charlotte. He also asks a lot of questions and is a big fan of Captain Man as well. In the episode "I Know Your Secret", Henry reveals to Jasper that he is Kid Danger, and is taken into the business.
 Ella Anderson as Piper Hart is Henry's little sister who is a fan of Captain Man. She and Henry are not that close. Piper claims that she hates her life and overreacts to various issues mostly about social media. Piper is also shown to be annoyed with Jasper's antics and seems to have a big rivalry with him.
 Michael D. Cohen as Schwoz (recurring, seasons 1–4; main, season 5) is a worker for Captain Man who handled the equipment in the man cave as he was the one who built it. Ray and Schwoz's friendship was strained when Schwoz stole Ray's girlfriend. They eventually made up when Henry convinced Ray to forgive Schwoz. Since then, Schwoz has come up with various inventions to help Captain Man and Kid Danger, though at times he can be weird and funny, which makes Henry and Ray furious. He sometimes refers to his sister as someone who looks like a horse. He also had a shape-shifting android as his "girlfriend".

Production 
The series was picked up with an initial production order of 20 episodes on March 13, 2014, later expanding to 26 episodes. On July 26, 2014, the series started airing with a one-hour special as the first episode. Series creator Dan Schneider stated on Twitter that a character from one of his previous series would make a guest appearance on the series.

On November 18, 2014, the series was renewed for a second season. The series was renewed for a third season on March 2, 2016. On November 16, 2016, the series was renewed for a fourth season.

In March 2018, Jace Norman indicated in an interview with Extra that the series was to be picked up for a fifth season. On July 27, 2018, the series was renewed for a fifth season of 20 episodes. In addition, Michael D. Cohen had been promoted to main cast, Christopher J. Nowak to showrunner, and Jake Farrow to executive producer. On December 3, 2018, it was announced that Nickelodeon had ordered 10 additional episodes for the fifth season, bringing the series to 117 produced episodes. On April 3, 2019, it was announced that Nickelodeon had ordered 10 additional episodes for the fifth season, bringing the series to 127 produced episodes, with 128 episodes ultimately being produced. On May 11, 2019, it was announced that Frankie Grande would return for a special musical episode that premiered on July 27, 2019. On December 7, 2019, Nickelodeon began advertising that the "final episodes" of the series would begin airing in January 2020.

Broadcast 
In the United States, the series premiered with a one-hour special on Nickelodeon on July 26, 2014. The first season concluded on May 16, 2015. The second season premiered on September 12, 2015, and concluded on July 17, 2016. The third season premiered on September 17, 2016, and concluded on October 7, 2017. The fourth season premiered on October 21, 2017, and concluded on October 20, 2018. The fifth season premiered on November 3, 2018, and concluded on March 21, 2020.

In Canada, the series premiered on YTV on October 8, 2014. In Australia and New Zealand, the series began airing on Nickelodeon on January 17, 2015. In the United Kingdom and Ireland, the series premiered on Nickelodeon on February 13, 2015.

Streaming 
The entire series is available to stream on Paramount+, while the first three seasons are available to stream on Netflix as of January 2021.

Reception

Critical
The parent reviews on Common Sense Media give the series 3 out of 5 stars based on 72 reviews.

Ratings 
 

| link2             = List of Henry Danger episodes#Season 2 (2015–16)
| episodes2         = 18
| start2            = 
| end2              = 
| startrating2      = 2.13
| endrating2        = 2.60
| viewers2          = |2}} 

| link3             = List of Henry Danger episodes#Season 3 (2016–17)
| episodes3         = 19
| start3            = 
| end3              = 
| startrating3      = 1.82
| endrating3        = 1.65
| viewers3          = |2}} 

| link4             = List of Henry Danger episodes#Season 4 (2017–18)
| episodes4         = 20
| start4            = 
| end4              = 
| startrating4      = 1.41
| endrating4        = 0.94
| viewers4          = |2}} 
                      
| link5             = List of Henry Danger episodes#Season 5 (2018–19)
| episodes5         = 39
| start5            = 
| end5              = 
| startrating5      = 1.11
| endrating5        = 1.26
| viewers5          = |2}} 
}}

Awards and nominations

Spinoffs

The Adventures of Kid Danger 

On March 2, 2017, Nickelodeon announced that a new animated series, under the working title of The Adventures of Kid Danger and Captain Man, was in development with 10 episodes announced. The Adventures of Kid Danger premiered on January 15, 2018 and concluded on June 14, 2018.

Film 
In May 2017, the president of Viacom's Nickelodeon group announced that a film based on the series was being developed. In January 2022, it was announced that Jace Norman would reprise the title role, and also serve as executive producer of a Henry Danger film set to be released on Paramount+.

Danger Force 

On February 19, 2020, it was announced that Henry Danger would be receiving a spinoff titled Danger Force which premiered on March 28, 2020. The series was created by Christopher J. Nowak and stars Cooper Barnes and Michael D. Cohen, reprising their roles from Henry Danger, with four new superheroes-in-training joining the team.

References

External links 
 
 
 

2010s American children's comedy television series
2010s Nickelodeon original programming
2020s American children's comedy television series
2020s Nickelodeon original programming
2014 American television series debuts
2020 American television series endings
English-language television shows
Television series by Schneider's Bakery
Television series created by Dan Schneider